Top Chef: All-Stars is the eighth season of the American reality television series Top Chef. The season was first filmed in New York City before concluding in The Bahamas. All-Stars consisted of chefs from the previous seven seasons who did not win the title of Top Chef. It premiered on December 1, 2010, and concluded on April 6, 2011. The cast was announced during the Top Chef: D.C. reunion special on September 22, 2010. In the season finale, Top Chef: Chicago runner-up Richard Blais was declared the winner over Top Chef: Las Vegas contestant Mike Isabella. Top Chef: New York runner-up Carla Hall was voted Fan Favorite.

Contestants
Eighteen past Top Chef contestants were selected to compete in Top Chef: All-Stars.

Contestant progress

: The chef(s) did not receive immunity for winning the Quickfire Challenge.
: Despite Richard making one of the judges' favorite dishes, he was seen plating past the Elimination Challenge's allotted time limit and was thus ineligible to win.
: There was no Quickfire Challenge in this episode.
: The judges could not decide on a losing dish, so all five chefs advanced to the finals.
 (WINNER) The chef won the season and was crowned "Top Chef".
 (RUNNER-UP) The chef was a runner-up for the season.
 (WIN) The chef won the Elimination Challenge.
 (HIGH) The chef was selected as one of the top entries in the Elimination Challenge, but did not win.
 (IN) The chef was not selected as one of the top or bottom entries in the Elimination Challenge and was safe.
 (LOW) The chef was selected as one of the bottom entries in the Elimination Challenge, but was not eliminated.
 (OUT) The chef lost the Elimination Challenge.

Episodes

References

External links
 Official website

Top Chef
2010 American television seasons
2011 American television seasons
Television shows set in New York City
Television shows filmed in New York (state)
Television shows filmed in New Jersey
Television shows filmed in the Bahamas